The 2012–13 Winnipeg Jets season was the 14th season for the National Hockey League franchise and the second in Winnipeg. The franchise played in Atlanta since the 1999–2000 NHL season, and relocated to Winnipeg following the conclusion of the 2010–11 NHL season. The regular season was reduced from its usual 82 games to 48 due to a lockout.

Regular season
The Jets struggled on the power play during the regular season and finished 30th overall in power-play percentage at 14.09% (21 for 149).

Standings

Schedule and results

|-  style="background:#fcf;"
| 1 || 19 || Ottawa || 4–1 || Winnipeg ||  || Pavelec || 15,004 || 0–1–0 || 0
|-  style="background:#ffc;"
| 2 || 21 || Winnipeg || 1–2 || Boston || SO || Pavelec  || 17,565 || 0–1–1 || 1
|-  style="background:#cfc;"
| 3 || 22 || Winnipeg || 4–2 || Washington ||  || Pavelec || 18,506 || 1–1–1 || 3
|-  style="background:#cfc;"
| 4 || 25 || Pittsburgh || 2–4 || Winnipeg ||  || Pavelec || 15,004 || 2–1–1 || 5
|-  style="background:#cfc;"
| 5 || 27 || NY Islanders || 4–5 || Winnipeg || OT || Montoya || 15,004 || 3–1–1 || 7
|-  style="background:#fcf;"
| 6 || 29 || Winnipeg || 3–4 || Montreal ||  || Pavelec || 21,273 || 3–2–1 || 7
|-  style="background:#fcf;"
| 7 || 31 || Winnipeg || 3–6 || Florida ||  || Pavelec || 15,731 || 3–3–1 || 7
|-

|-  style="background:#fcf;"
| 8 || 1 || Winnipeg || 3–8 || Tampa Bay ||  || Pavelec || 19,204 || 3–4–1 || 7
|-  style="background:#cfc;"
| 9 || 5 || Florida || 2–3 || Winnipeg || OT || Pavelec || 15,004 || 4–4–1 || 9
|-  style="background:#fcf;"
| 10 || 7 || Toronto || 3–2 || Winnipeg ||  || Pavelec || 15,004 || 4–5–1 || 9
|-  style="background:#cfc;"
| 11 || 9 || Winnipeg || 1–0 || Ottawa ||  || Montoya || 18,594 || 5–5–1 || 11
|-  style="background:#fcf;"
| 12 || 12 || Philadelphia || 3–2  || Winnipeg ||  || Pavelec || 15,004 || 5–6–1 || 11
|-  style="background:#fcf;"
| 13 || 15 || Pittsburgh || 3–1 || Winnipeg ||  || Pavelec || 15,004 || 5–7–1 || 11
|-  style="background:#fcf;"
| 14 || 17 || Boston || 3–2 || Winnipeg ||  || Pavelec || 15,004 || 5–8–1 || 11
|-  style="background:#cfc;"
| 15 || 19 || Winnipeg || 2–1 || Buffalo ||  || Pavelec || 19,070 || 6–8–1 || 13
|-  style="background:#cfc;"
| 16 || 21 || Winnipeg || 4–3 || Carolina ||  || Pavelec || 18,282 || 7–8–1 || 15
|-  style="background:#fcf;"
| 17 || 23 || Winnipeg || 3–5 || Philadelphia ||  || Pavelec || 19,933 || 7–9–1 || 15
|-  style="background:#cfc;"
| 18 || 24 || Winnipeg || 4–2 || New Jersey ||  || Pavelec || 17,625 || 8–9–1 || 17
|-  style="background:#cfc;"
| 19 || 26 || Winnipeg || 4–3 || NY Rangers ||  || Pavelec || 17,200 || 9–9–1 || 19
|-  style="background:#cfc;"
| 20 || 28 || New Jersey || 1–3 || Winnipeg ||  || Pavelec || 15,004 || 10–9–1 || 21
|-

|-  style="background:#fcf;"
| 21 || 2 || Washington || 3–0 || Winnipeg ||  || Pavelec || 15,004 || 10–10–1 || 21
|-  style="background:#fcf;"
| 22 || 5 || Winnipeg || 1–4  || Florida ||  || Pavelec || 14,574 || 10–11–1 || 21 
|-  style="background:#cfc;"
| 23 || 7 || Winnipeg || 2–1  || Tampa Bay ||  || Montoya || 19,204 || 11–11–1 || 23 
|-  style="background:#cfc;"
| 24 || 8 || Winnipeg || 3–2  || Florida || OT || Pavelec || 16,442 || 12–11–1 || 25 
|-  style="background:#ffc;"
| 25 || 10 || Winnipeg || 2–3 || New Jersey || SO || Pavelec || 17,625 || 12–11–2 || 26 
|-  style="background:#cfc;"
| 26 || 12 || Toronto || 2–5 || Winnipeg ||  || Pavelec || 15,004 || 13–11–2 || 28
|-  style="background:#cfc;"
| 27 || 14 || NY Rangers || 1–3 || Winnipeg ||  || Pavelec || 15,004 || 14–11–2 || 30
|-  style="background:#cfc;"
| 28 || 16 || Winnipeg || 5–4 || Toronto || SO || Pavelec || 19,401 || 15–11–2 || 32
|-  style="background:#fcf;"
| 29 || 17 || Winnipeg || 1–4 || Ottawa ||  || Pavelec || 19,227 || 15–12–2 || 32
|-  style="background:#cfc;"
| 30 || 19 || Boston || 1–3 || Winnipeg ||  || Pavelec || 15,004 || 16–12–2 || 34
|-  style="background:#fcf;"
| 31 || 21 || Washington || 4–0 || Winnipeg ||  || Pavelec || 15,004 || 16–13–2 || 34
|-  style="background:#fcf;"
| 32 || 22 || Washington || 6–1 || Winnipeg ||  || Pavelec || 15,004 || 16–14–2 || 34
|-  style="background:#cfc;"
| 33 || 24 || Tampa Bay || 2–3 || Winnipeg ||  || Pavelec || 15,004 || 17–14–2 || 36
|-  style="background:#cfc;"
| 34 || 26 || Winnipeg || 4–1 || Carolina ||  || Pavelec || 16,225 || 18–14–2 || 38
|-  style="background:#fcf;"
| 35 || 28 || Winnipeg || 0–4 || Pittsburgh ||  || Montoya || 18,649 || 18–15–2 || 38
|-  style="background:#fcf;"
| 36 || 30 || Carolina || 3–1 || Winnipeg ||  || Pavelec || 15,004 || 18–16–2 || 38
|-

|-  style="background:#fcf;"
| 37 || 1 || Winnipeg || 2–4 || NY Rangers ||  || Pavelec || 17,200 || 18–17–2 || 38
|-  style="background:#fcf;"
| 38 || 2 || Winnipeg || 2–5 || NY Islanders ||  || Pavelec || 11,819 || 18–18–2 || 38
|-  style="background:#fcf;"
| 39 || 4 || Winnipeg || 1–4 || Montreal ||  || Pavelec || 21,273 || 18–19–2 || 38
|-  style="background:#cfc;"
| 40 || 6 || Philadelphia || 1–4 || Winnipeg ||  || Pavelec || 15,004 || 19–19–2 || 40
|-  style="background:#cfc;"
| 41 || 9 || Buffalo || 1–4 || Winnipeg ||  || Pavelec || 15,004 || 20–19–2 || 42
|-  style="background:#cfc;"
| 42 || 11 || Florida || 2–7 || Winnipeg ||  || Pavelec || 15,004 || 21–19–2 || 44
|-  style="background:#cfc;"
| 43 || 16 || Tampa Bay || 3–4 || Winnipeg || SO || Pavelec || 15,004 || 22–19–2 || 46
|-  style="background:#cfc;"
| 44 || 18 || Carolina || 3–4 || Winnipeg || OT || Pavelec || 15,004 || 23–19–2 || 48
|-  style="background:#ffc;"
| 45 || 20 || NY Islanders || 5–4 || Winnipeg || SO || Pavelec || 15,004 || 23–19–3 || 49
|-  style="background:#cfc;"
| 46 || 22 || Winnipeg || 2–1 || Buffalo ||  || Pavelec || 18,654 || 24–19–3 || 51
|-  style="background:#fcf;"
| 47 || 23 || Winnipeg || 3–5 || Washington ||  || Pavelec || 18,506 || 24–20–3 || 51
|-  style="background:#fcf;"
| 48 || 25 || Montreal || 4–2 || Winnipeg ||  || Pavelec || 15,004 || 24–21–3 || 51
|-

|- style="text-align:center;"
| Legend:       = Win       = Loss       = OT/SO Loss

Player statistics
Final stats 

Skaters

Goaltenders

†Denotes player spent time with another team before joining the Jets.  Stats reflect time with the Jets only.
‡Traded mid-season
Bold/italics denotes franchise record

Transactions 
Winnipeg has been involved in the following transactions during the 2012–13 season.

Trades

Free agents signed

Free agents lost

Claimed via waivers

Lost via waivers

Lost via retirement

Player signings

Draft picks 
Winnipeg's picks at the 2012 NHL Entry Draft in Pittsburgh, Pennsylvania.

See also 
 2012–13 NHL season

References

Winnipeg Jets seasons
Winnipeg Jets season, 2012-13
Winn